The following is a list of the final 2015 Professional Indoor Football League (PIFL) team rosters:

Alabama Hammers

Nashville Venom

Richmond Raiders

References

Professional Indoor Football League